The 2017 Mubadala World Tennis Championship was a non-ATP/WTA-affiliated exhibition tennis tournament. It was the 10th edition of the Mubadala World Tennis Championship with the world's top players competing in the event, held in a knockout format. The prize money for the winner was $250,000. The event was held at the International Tennis Centre at the Zayed Sports City in Abu Dhabi, United Arab Emirates.

Champions

Men's singles
  
  Kevin Anderson def.  Roberto Bautista Agut, 6–4, 7–6(7–0)

Women's singles 
  Jeļena Ostapenko def.  Serena Williams, 6–2, 3–6, [10–5]

Players

Men's singles

Withdrawals 
Before the tournament
  Rafael Nadal → replaced by  Roberto Bautista Agut
  Stan Wawrinka → replaced by  Kevin Anderson
  Milos Raonic → replaced by  Andrey Rublev
During the tournament
  Novak Djokovic → replaced by  Andy Murray (for a one-set exhibition match against  Roberto Bautista Agut)

Women's singles

References

External links
Official website

World Tennis Championship
2017 in Emirati tennis
World Tennis Championship
December 2017 sports events in Asia